A Skylit Drive is an American post-hardcore band from Lodi, California. The band has released one DVD, one EP and five studio albums: Wires...and the Concept of Breathing (2008), Adelphia (2009), Identity on Fire (2011), Rise (2013) and, most recently, ASD (2015). The band has toured internationally both as headliner and supporting act. In 2017, the band broke up after a dispute between Nick Miller and Michael Jagmin.

History

Formation, She Watched the Sky EP and Blake's departure (2006–2007)
A Skylit Drive's original members met while attending Lodi High School in Lodi, California. Original vocalist Jordan Blake served as the band's vocalist until late 2007, before leaving the band due to health concerns. Their debut EP, She Watched the Sky, was released January 2007 on Tragic Hero. Following this, the group toured with Four Letter Lie, Blessthefall, Scary Kids Scaring Kids, Greeley Estates, Oh, Sleeper, The Blackout, Alesana, Before Their Eyes, Dance Gavin Dance, Kenotia, Pierce the Veil and From First to Last.

Jordan Blake left the band mid-tour around November 2007 because of health issues making him unable to tour. He was briefly replaced by Jonny Craig, who also recorded a demo version of "Knights of the Round". He was replaced by Craig Mabbitt (formerly of blessthefall) before Michael "Jag" Jagmin joined to complete the current lineup. Jordan Blake went on to form the band Speak of the Devil in 2013.

Jagmin's arrival, Wires...and the Concept of Breathing (2008)
The full-length Wires...and the Concept of Breathing (produced by Mitchell Marlow and Allen Jacob) appeared in May 2008. The album reached No. 171 on the U.S. Billboard 200, and No. 20 on the Top Independent Albums chart. Jagmin later described Wires... as "kind of the staple album that everybody goes back to for us" although it "took a year to really catch on". Shortly after the release of the album they filmed a music video for the nonprofit group To Write Love on Her Arms directed by Robby Starbuck. They appeared at The Bamboozle Left in 2008 and toured in the summer of that year with Sky Eats Airplane, Breathe Carolina, and Emarosa.

They toured with Greeley Estates, August Burns Red, Sky Eats Airplane, This or the Apocalypse, Escape the Fate, Alesana, Chiodos, and Silverstein during fall in 2008. They also filmed a live DVD called Let Go of the Wires, which was released on December 9, 2008.

In mid-November the band released a music video for the song "Wires and the Concept of Breathing". The video can be viewed through their MySpace profile. Their song "This Isn't the End" is now the music video on their MySpace directed by Robby Starbuck about teen suicide in conjunction with the non-profit organization To Write Love on Her Arms. Both videos are on their first full-length album, Wires... and the Concept of Breathing, and the band has shot other videos for songs on the album. They announced that there will be five brand new videos on their upcoming DVD "Let Go of the Wires" as well as live performance footage from a show at the Glasshouse in Pomona, CA. The DVD was released exclusively at Hot Topic on December 9, 2008.

Adelphia (2009–2010)
In early 2009 the band signed Fearless Records and announced co-headlining tour Dance Gavin Dance in April/May. The band was a part of Warped Tour for the 2009 season. On May 26, 2009, A Skylit Drive released a new song, entitled "Those Cannons Could Sink a Ship" onto iTunes and also for play on their MySpace page. Their second full-length album, Adelphia, was released on June 9, 2009, and peaked at number 64 on the Billboard 200. Singer Jagmin described it as "our most experimental album". The band released a music video for "Those Cannons Could Sink A Ship!" on October 19, 2009, directed by Spence Nicholson. The band filled in a support slot for Senses Fail in October, before they embarked on their first ten-date tour of Europe. The band recorded a cover of Journey's "Separate Ways (Worlds Apart)" for the next Punk Goes compilation. The band signed with Hassle Records in the UK, where the album was released in October 2009. From February to April 2010, the band toured the US and Europe as the main support to Alesana, on their 'The Emptiness Tour'.

Identity on Fire (2011)
Jagmin indicated that the band would begin writing and recording a follow-up to Adelphia in the middle of 2010 and suggested that the album would see an early 2011 release. The band announced in May 2010 that Desires of Sires will debut on their Adelphia tour. In July 2010 it was announced that the 6-piece had entered the studio recording together with Cameron Webb. The band was on the "Average Guys with Exceptional Hair" tour with bands Woe, Is Me, For All Those Sleeping, Motionless in White and Scarlett O'Hara.

On December 7, 2010, the band announced the track listing for the album and a date set on February 15, 2011. They toured mid January through February with Underoath, Thursday, and Animals as Leaders, and released a music video for "Too Little Too Late" on January 12, 2011. They were part of the Warped Tour 2011 at the Ernie Ball stage. The band also announced a European tour in late 2011 along with Woe, Is Me, I Set My Friends on Fire, and Sleeping with Sirens, and recorded the cover "Love the Way You Lie" for the Punk Goes... Compilation.

On January 20, 2012, A Skylit Drive released The Cali Buds music video, via Altpress.com, and in February toured South East Asia with Australian band, For This Cause.

Departure of Joey Wilson and Rise (2012–2013)
By the middle of 2012 the band had begun the pre-production and would be entering the studio with Cameron Mizell in June 2013. On September 21, 2012, lead guitarist Joey Wilson confirmed that he had left the band, citing that it was "time for us both to move on to different things".

The band recorded a new single; entitled "Fallen", which was released on November 30, 2012 on the band's YouTube channel. After two albums, A Skylit Drive returned to Tragic Hero Records as they felt "like we needed a little bit more personal attention, [and they were] just able to give us a little more personal attention. They wanted us to be in the position where we were confident with the album". On November 26, the band embarked on the Nut Up or Shut Up tour, supporting Bless The Fall. Further pre-production took place in February 2013 in LA.

It was announced on April 22, 2013, that the band entered the studio a week before to continue writing their album with Jim Wirt (Hoobastank, Alien Ant Farm), while Kit Walters, Mitchell Marlow and Al Jacobs also participated. With the time available to them, Jagmin explained that "we definitely gave each song more time than we were ever able to before. Everything was done minus the vocals on two songs, so I had a whole month to write vocals for two songs". In April 2013 the band played the Pulp Summer Slam XIII Til Death Do Us Part rock festival in Manila, Philippines. while they wrapped up pre-production with Jim Wirt in Cleveland at the start of May.

The official recording sessions with producer Cameron Mizell began on June 1 at the Chango Studios in Lake Mary, Florida. Drums, bass, guitar and electronics were completed by mid-June, with the band moving to Cameron Mizell's studio in Phoenix, to record vocals. The band finished recording on June 30, 2013. On July 18, the band announced that their brand new album would be entitled Rise, and set for release on September 24, followed by a headlining tour in support of the new album. Drummer La Quay commented that "[We] really sat down for almost nine months and [...] wrote a bunch of songs and had a bunch of different ears on it, and a bunch of different perspectives on it". On July 31, the band released the first single and title track off their new album, "Rise". By mid August the band released the track listing and announced an Australian tour supporting Dream On, Dreamer for November 2013. On September 6, the band released the second single of the album titled "Unbreakable".

Rise sold over 10,000 copies in its first week of release, leaving Jagmin to comment that the album had "caught on faster than the other ones". In March–April 2014 they were a supporting act on the Memphis May Fire "The Unconditional Tour". They also announced that they would once again be performing on Warped Tour for the 2014 season.

Lineup changes, Rise: Ascension, ASD, Jagmin departure rumors and hiatus (2014–2017)
On October 21, both Brian White and Cory La Quay announced that they would be leaving the band due to creative differences, while the rest of the band decided to continue. On January 6, 2015, an acoustic version of the last album, entitled Rise: Ascension, was released. The following March they announced the addition of two new members, Michael Labelle (ex-Of Reverie, Preeminent) on guitars and Brandon Richter (formerly of Motionless in White) on drums. On March 10, 2015, they released the music video for "Within These Walls", and announced a North American tour. They released their fifth regular studio album ASD on October 9, 2015, and embarked on a tour in support of it. As of September 2016 the band are reduced to a four piece, without a permanent drummer. In March 2017 it was announced that band was on hiatus following Jagmin's departure.

Signals (2018–present)
Jagmin took control of the band's social media to announce a name change to Signals. The new Signals band included Jagmin and guitarist Jon Kintz, both ex-members of Odd Project. Signals released the single "The Vulture (All It Takes II)". The debut Signals album, Death in Divide, was produced by Curtis Douglas and released on November 27, 2020. 

On February 16, 2022, a song entitled "Dead Serious" was released under the name A Skylit Drive, and shared onto the Facebook page for Signals, which had changed its profile picture to an A Skylit Drive logo. This led to speculation that Jagmin was attempting to take control of the band.

Jordan Blake's return (2022–present)
On January 23, 2022, the Instagram and Twitter accounts of the band's original 2006 lineup announced that they were reuniting in celebration of the 15th anniversary of their debut EP She Watched the Sky.  The reformed group booked festival appearances at So What?! and Swanfest 2022.

Musical style
While the band's debut EP involved predominantly screaming vocals, this was changed during the recording of the Wires... album when Jagmin became the lead vocalist. The band were "happy with the vocal style we've chosen [as] the popularity of Wires along with it [...] gives us a good enough thumbs up that the singing/screaming ratio we've stuck to is what works for us".

Members

Prior to the dispute

Last lineup of 2017
 Nick Miller – lead guitar (2012–2017), rhythm guitar (2005–2012; studio only 2012–2013)
 Kyle Simmons – keyboards, piano, synthesizers (2005–2017), bass (occasionally 2012–2014, full-time 2014–2017), rhythm guitar (live only 2012–2013, 2013–2015), drums, percussion (2014–2015, 2016–2017)
 Michael Jagmin – lead vocals (2008–2017)
 Michael Labelle – rhythm guitar, unclean vocals (2015–2017)

Former members
 Curtis Danger – bass (2005)
 Jordan Blake – lead vocals (2005–2007)
 Joey Wilson – lead guitar (2005–2012)
 Brian White – bass, unclean vocals, backing clean vocals (2005–2014)
 Cory La Quay – drums, percussion, backing unclean vocals (2005–2014)
 Brandon Richter – drums, percussion (2015–2016)

Former touring musicians
 Jonny Craig – lead vocals (2007)
 Craig Mabbitt – lead vocals (2007)
 Justin Trotta – guitar (2010)
 Dominick Martino – drums (2016)
 Ian Seth – drums (2017)

Former session musicians
 Jim Wirt – bass (2015)
 Bret Wier – drums (2015)

Timeline

After the dispute

Original lineup reunion (2022-present)
 Jordan Blake – lead vocals
 Nick Miller – rhythm guitar
 Joey Wilson – lead guitar
 Brian White – bass, unclean vocals, backing clean vocals
 Cory La Quay – drums, percussion, backing unclean vocals

Signals (2018-present)
 Michael Jagmin – lead vocals, bass
 Jon Kintz – guitars, unclean vocals

Discography

 Wires...and the Concept of Breathing (2008)
 Adelphia (2009)
 Identity on Fire (2011)
 Rise (2013)
 ASD (2015)

References

External links
 
 

Musical groups established in 2005
Musical groups from California
People from Lodi, California
American post-hardcore musical groups
American screamo musical groups
Metalcore musical groups from California
Fearless Records artists
2005 establishments in California
Tragic Hero Records artists